Katie Buckhaven is a British female singer whose style is an eclectic mix of jazz and folk songs.

Buckhaven played support to Ben & Jason and Carina Round on the Acoustic Roadworks tour 2001; she has also played with her band at various venues in London.

Buckhaven has also toured Europe, playing solo gigs in bars in Paris, Seville, and Berlin where she sang in French, Spanish, and Italian.

Discography
 Katie Buckhaven – 2005
 Forever Can Wait – The Big Untidy EP
 The Girl in the White Dress – 2010

References

External links
 
 Lemonrock review

English women singers
English songwriters
Living people
Year of birth missing (living people)